Nikolay Valeryevich Davydov (born 11 April 1970) is a retired male hammer thrower from Kyrgyzstan. His personal best throw was 77.90 metres, achieved in July 1995 in Moscow.

Achievements

References

External links
 

1970 births
Living people
Kyrgyzstani hammer throwers
Athletes (track and field) at the 1998 Asian Games
Athletes (track and field) at the 2000 Summer Olympics
Olympic athletes of Kyrgyzstan
Asian Games medalists in athletics (track and field)
Male hammer throwers
Kyrgyzstani male athletes
Asian Games bronze medalists for Kyrgyzstan
Medalists at the 1998 Asian Games
Kyrgyzstani people of Russian descent
20th-century Kyrgyzstani people
21st-century Kyrgyzstani people